Old Burial Hill is a historic cemetery in Marblehead, Massachusetts.  It is located on the high ground between Marblehead's colonial-era residential and retail district, called "Downtown" by longtime residents and "Old Town" by others, and the Barnegat neighborhood that stretches from Little Harbor to Doliber's Cove, and is accessible via a walkway at Redd's Pond and a stairway at the intersection of Orne and Pond streets. It was the location of Marblehead's First Meeting House built around 1638. Old Burial Hill features scenic vistas of Marblehead Harbor and Salem Sound.

The burying ground was founded in 1638 and contains many historic Puritan gravestones featuring diverse stone carving artwork from the seventeenth century. The burial ground also contains the remains of a victim of the 1692 Salem Witch Trials. It is referenced briefly in the horror author H.P Lovecraft's short-story, The Festival.

It was the setting of the daytime cemetery scenes in Disney's 1993 Halloween comedy-drama film Hocus Pocus.  The nighttime cemetery scenes, including Billy Butcherson's resurrection, were filmed on a sound stage at Walt Disney Studios in Burbank, California. Select scenes for the film The Good Son (1993) were also filmed here.

Notable burials and cenotaphs
Wilmot Redd, victim of 1692 Salem Witch Trials
General John Glover, Revolutionary War general
Joseph Brown, known as "Black Joe," Revolutionary war soldier, owner of Black Joe's Tavern
Timothy Dexter, businessman

References

External links

Buildings and structures in Marblehead, Massachusetts
Cemeteries in Essex County, Massachusetts
1638 establishments in Massachusetts
Cemeteries established in the 17th century